Bird & Bird is an international law firm that was founded in London in 1846. The firm has since expanded to over 30 offices in Europe, Asia, and the Middle East, and has a particular focus on the technology, media, and telecommunications sectors. In addition to its core practice areas of intellectual property, litigation, and corporate and commercial law, the firm also covers areas such as employment, competition, and regulatory law. Bird & Bird's clients are based across 118 countries worldwide and 75% of major clients work with more than one office, making it a truly collaborative international network.

History

Founding and establishment
Bird & Bird’s history stretches back to the 1830s and the firm was formally established in the UK in 1846.

2000s
In 2000, the firm opened offices in France and Sweden. One year later it opened in The Netherlands and the following year it opened its first office in Germany.

In 2003, the expansion continued, with a new office in Italy and a second office in Germany.

In 2004, the number of partners at the firm reached 100 for the first time, and the expansion continued unabated with a new office in Beijing. The following year saw new offices in Madrid, Rome and Frankfurt.

2006 saw a further opening of  new office in Lyon in France.

2008 saw the firm open a Finnish office in Helsinki through a merger with a leading Finnish firm Fennica, as well as four other offices in the Czech Republic, Hungary, Poland and Slovakia and a third office in China with the opening of an office in Shanghai. On top of this, expansion in London continued through a merger with Lane & Partners.

2010s
Bird & Bird continued to expand its international reach and in May 2013, merged with Danish outfit BvHD, completing its coverage of the Nordic region. The same year, the firm signed an international cooperation agreement with BCCC Avocats, located in Switzerland.

In November 2014, Bird & Bird merged with leading Australian new economy specialist law firm, Truman Hoyle, to create their first office in Australia. The merger brought their presence in the Asia Pacific region to 5 offices, with another 5 formal co-operation agreements in place in Malaysia, China, Indonesia and Korea.

Bird & Bird's international growth continued with the launch of a Luxembourg office in 2016.

In 2018, the firm welcomed a new hub office in Amsterdam, and a representative office in downtown San Francisco, their first office in the USA.

Diversity
Bird & Bird has a Diversity & Inclusion committee that aims to provide and maintain an inclusive work environment.

Clients
In 2021, Bird & Bird advised DP Poland, the UK AIM listed company which owns the Domino’s Pizza franchise in Poland, on its acquisition of a domestic Polish pizza restaurant chain called Dominium SA.

Awards
The firm was awarded “Most Admired Law Firm” by Legal Cheek in 2021, and “Global Firm of the Year” by Who’s Who Legal 2021 in IT, Telecoms and Media, Life Sciences – Patent Litigation, and Patents.

References

External links

Law firms of the United Kingdom
Intellectual property law firms
Patent law firms
Law firms established in 1846
1846 establishments in the United Kingdom
Foreign law firms with offices in the Netherlands
Foreign law firms with offices in Hong Kong